Poleň is a municipality and village in Klatovy District in the Plzeň Region of the Czech Republic. It has about 300 inhabitants. The village of Poleň is well preserved and is protected by law as a village monument zone.

Administrative parts

Villages of Mlýnec, Poleňka, Pušperk and Zdeslav are administrative parts of Poleň.

Geography
It lies in the Švihov Highlands, in the valley of the Poleňka Stream.

History
The first written mention of Poleň is in a document of Queen Kunigunde of Hohenstaufen from 1245, where Blažej of Poleň is recorded as a witness.

The history of the village was then connected with the Pušperk Castle, which was first mentioned in 1266 and founded shortly before. It was conquered and destroyed before 1434. The castle was repaired between 1465 and 1473, but in 1473 it was demolished again and definitely became a ruin.

Demographics

Sights
The Church of All the Saints dates from the 14th century. It has valuable oil painting of Madonna with Child from the 16th century. Behind the church is the ruin of Church of Saint Margaret, abolished in 1786. Other sacral monuments include the Chapel of Saint Salvador of Horta, and the Chapel of Saint John of Nepomuk in Zdeslav.

Notable people
Abraham Klauber (1831–1911), American entrepreneur

Gallery

References

External links

Villages in Klatovy District